Nicolas Janny (19 March 1749 – 6 February 1822) was an 18th–19th-century French priest, pedagogue and grammarian. He was first principal of the college of Remiremont.

Bibliography 
Pierre Heili, « Nicolas Janny » in Albert Ronsin (dir.), Les Vosgiens célèbres. Dictionnaire biographique illustré, Éditions Gérard Louis, Vagney, 1990, (p. 204) 
F. A. Puton, « L'abbé Janny, ancien principal du collège de Remiremont », in Mémoires de l'Académie Stanislas, 1887

French abbots
French educational theorists
Grammarians from France
Clergy from Metz
1749 births
1822 deaths